The Australian Football League celebrates the best mark of the season through the annual Mark of the Year competition. Each round three marks are nominated and fans are able to vote online for their favourite. Majak Daw of the North Melbourne Football Club for his mark taken in round 18 against the Collingwood Football Club.

Winners by round
Legend

Finalists

References

External links

Mark of the Year
Australian rules football-related lists